This is a list of animals whose names appear in the Bible. Whenever required for the identification, the Hebrew name will be indicated, as well as the specific term used by zoologists. This list will include names such as griffon, lamia, Siren and unicorn, which, though generally applied to fabulous beings, have nevertheless, because of misunderstandings or educational prejudices of the Greek and Latin translators, crept into the versions, and have been applied to real animals. In the following list D.V. stands for Douay Version, A.V. and R.V. for Authorized and Revised Version respectively.

A
Addax — A kind of antelope with twisted horns; it very probably corresponds to the דִּישׁוֹן (dîshõn) of the Hebrews and the pygarg of the divers translations (Deuteronomy ).
Adder — A poisonous snake of the genus Vipera. The word, unused in the D.V., stands in the A.V. for four different Hebrew names of serpents.
Ant (נְמָלָה nəmālāh; Proverbs) — Over twelve species of ants exist in Israel; among them the ants of the genus Atta are particularly common, especially the Atta barbara, of dark color, and the Atta structor, a brown species. These, with the Pheidole megacephala, are, unlike the ants of northern countries, accustomed to lay up stores of grain for winter use. Hence the allusions of the wise man in the two above-mentioned passages of Proverbs.
Antelope — The word, first applied as a qualification to the gazelle, on account of the lustre and soft expression of its eye, has become the name of a genus of ruminant quadrupeds intermediate between the deer and the goat. Four species are mentioned in the Bible:
 , dîshon (D.V. pygarg; Deuteronomy ), commonly identified with the Addax (Addax nasomaculatus);
 , tsebhî (Deuteronomy , etc.; D.V. roe) or gazelle, Dorcas gazelle (Gazella dorcas);
 , the'ô (D.V. wild goat; Isaiah , D.V. wild ox), which seems to be the bubal hartebeest (†Alcelaphus buselaphus buselaphus)); and
 , yákhmûr, the name of which is given by the Arabs to the roebuck (Capreolus capreolus) of Northern Syria and to the Arabian oryx (Oryx leucoryx)) (the white antelope,) of the desert.
Ape ( qōf) — Nowhere in the Bible is the ape supposed to be indigenous to Israel. Apes are mentioned with gold, silver, ivory, and peacocks among the precious things imported by Solomon from Tharsis (1 Kings ; 2 Chronicles ). The "ape" of the KJV is what is called an Old World monkey today. "True apes" (humans, chimpanzees, gorillas and orangutans) were known of only later.
Asp — This word, which occurs eleven times in D.V., stands for four Hebrew names:
 פֶתֶן péthén (Job , ; Psalms 58 (Vulgate: Ps. 57):5; Isaiah ). From several allusions both to its deadly venom (Deuteronomy 32:33), and to its use by serpent-charmers (Ps. 58 (Vulgate: Ps. 57)), it appears that the cobra (naja aspis) is most probably signified. Safely to step upon its body, or even linger by the hole where it coils itself, is manifestly a sign of God's particular protection (Ps. 91 (Vulgate: Ps. 90); Isaiah 11:8]. Sophar, one of Job's friends, speaks of the wicked as sucking the venom of péthén, in punishment whereof the food he takes shall be turned within him into the gall of this poisonous reptile (Job 20:14, 16).
 שַׁחַל sháhál is also found only once to signify a snake, Ps. 91 (Vulgate: Ps. 90): 13; but what particular kind of snake we are unable to determine. The word Sháhál (usually meaning "lion") might possibly, owing to some copyist's mistake, have crept into the place of another name now impossible to restore.
 צֶפַע tsif‘ōnî, "the hisser", generally rendered by basilisk in ID.V. and in ancient translations, the latter sometimes calling it regulus. This snake was deemed so deadly that, according to the common saying, its hissing alone, even its look, was fatal. It was probably a small viper, perhaps a cerastes, possibly the daboia zanthina, according to Cheyne.
Ass — The ass (male עַיִר ’ăyir, female אָתוֹן ’ăṯōn, wild פֶרֶא pere) has always enjoyed a marked favour above all other beasts of burden in the Bible. This is evidenced by more than one hundred and thirty mentions of this animal in Bible, and by the number of words in the Hebrew vocabulary used to designate the ass, by colour, sex, age, and so forth, in striking contrast with the ordinary penury of the sacred language. Of these various names the most common is חֲמוֹר (hamôr), "reddish", the hair of the eastern ass being generally of that colour. White asses, more rare, were also more appreciated and reserved for the use of the nobles (Judges ). Hence the several regulations brought forth by Israel's lawgiver on this subject: the neighbour's ass should not be coveted (Exodus 20:17); moreover, should the neighbour's stray ass be found, it should be taken care of, and its owner assisted in tending this part of his herd.

The ass serves in the East for many purposes. Its even gait and sure-footedness, so well suited to the rough paths of the Holy Land, made it at all times the most popular of all the animals for riding in those hilly regions (Genesis 22:3; Luke 19:30). Neither was it ridden only by the common people, but also by persons of the highest rank (Judges 5:10; 10:4; 2 Samuel 17:23; 19:26, etc.). No wonder therefore that Jesus, about to come triumphantly to Jerusalem, commanded His disciples to bring Him an ass and her colt; no lesson of humility, as is sometimes asserted, but the affirmation of the peaceful character of His kingdom should be sought there. Although the Scripture speaks of "saddling" the ass, usually no saddle was used by the rider. A cloth was spread upon the back of the ass and fastened by a strap was all the equipment. Upon this cloth the rider sat with a servant usually walking alongside. Should a family journey, the women and children would ride the asses, attended by the father (Exodus 4:20). This mode of traveling has been popularized by Christian painters, who copied the eastern customs in their representations of the Holy Family's flight to Egypt.

Scores of passages in the Bible allude to asses carrying burdens. The Gospels, at least in the Greek text, speak of millstones run by asses (Matthew 18:6, Mark 9:41; Luke 17:2); Josephus and the Egyptian monuments teach us that this animal was used for threshing wheat. Finally, we repeatedly read in the Old Testament of asses hitched to a plough (Deuteronomy 22:10; Isaiah 30:24, etc.), and in reference to this custom, the Law forbade ploughing with an ox and an ass together (Deuteronomy 22:10). From Is., 21:7, confirmed by the statements of Greek writers, we learn that part of the cavalry force in the Persian army rode donkeys. We should perhaps understand from IV K., vii, 7, that the Syrian armies followed the same practice; but no such custom seems to have ever prevailed among the Hebrews. With them the ass was essentially for peaceful use, the emblem of peace, as the horse was the symbol of war. The flesh of the donkey was unclean and forbidden by the Law. In some particular circumstances, however, no law could prevail over necessity, and we read that during Joram's reign, when Ben-hadad besieged Samaria, the famine was so extreme in this city, that the head of an ass was sold for 120 pieces of silver (IV K., vi, 25).

Ass, colt — This is more specially the symbol of peace and meek obedience (John 12:15, πῶλον ὄνου pōlon onou).
Ass, wild, corresponds in the Old Testament to two words, péré' and 'arôdh. Whether these two names refer to different species, or are, the one, the genuine Hebrew name, the other, the Aramaic equivalent for the same animal, is uncertain. Both signify one of the wildest and most untamable animals. The wild ass is larger and more shapely than the domestic one, and outruns the fleetest horse. Its strength joined to its nimbleness and love of freedom made it a fit symbol for the first born son of Abraham who like Joseph was separated from his father and like Joseph became a great leader[Y'shmaEL], Ismael[ gen;17;20] (Genesis 16:12). The wild ass, extinct in western Asia, still exists in central Asia and the deserts of Africa.
Attacus (Leviticus 11:22) — Instead of this Latin word, the A.V. reads bald-locust. According to the tradition enshrined in the Talmud, the common truxalis, a locust with a very long smooth head is probably signified. The Hebrew word is סָלְעָם sālə‘ām.
Aurochs, or wild ox (urus, bos primigenius), is undoubtedly the rimu of the Assyrian inscriptions, and consequently corresponds to the re'em or rêm (רְאֵם) of the Hebrews. The latter word is translated sometimes in the D.V. as rhinoceros (Numbers 23:22; 24:8; Deuteronomy 33:17; Job 39:9, 10), sometimes by unicorn (Psalm 22:21; 29:6; 92:10). That the re'em, far from being unicorn, was a two-horned animal, is suggested by Psalm 22:21, and forcibly evidenced by Deut. 33:17, where its horns represent the two tribes of Ephraim and Manasses. That, moreover, it was akin to the domestic ox is shown from such parallelisms as we find in Psalm 24:6, where we read, according to the critical editions of the Hebrew text: "The voice of Yahweh makes Lebanon skip like a bullock, and Sirion like a young re'em"; or Is.,34:7: "And the re'em shall go down with them, and the bulls with the mighty"; and still more convincingly by such implicit descriptions as that of Job 39:9, 10: "Shall the rêm be willing to serve thee, or will he stay at thy crib? Canst thou bind the rêm with thy thong to plough, or will he break the clods of the valleys after thee?" These references will be very clear, the last especially, once we admit the re'em is an almost untamable wild ox, which one would try in vain to submit to the same work as its domestic kin. Hence there is very little doubt that in all the above-mentioned places the word aurochs should be substituted for rhinoceros and unicorn. The aurochs is for the sacred poets a familiar emblem of untamed strength and ferocity. It no longer exists in western Asia.

B
Baboon, a kind of dog-faced, long-haired monkey, dwelling among ruins (gen. Cynocephalus); it was an object of worship for the Egyptians.
Badger Tahashim — No mention of the badger (meles taxus) is found in the D.V., whereas the A.V. regularly gives it as the English equivalent for táhásh (תַּחַשׁ). Skins of táháshim are repeatedly spoken of as used for the outer coverings of the tabernacle and of the several pieces of its furniture and utensils and tools. The old translations, and the D.V. after them, understood the word táhásh to mean a color (violet; Exodus 25:5; 26:14; 35:7, 23; 36:19; 39:34; Numbers 4:6, 8, 10, 11, 12, 14, 25; Ezekiel 16:10); but this is a "misrepresentation" according to Talmudic writers; so also is the rendering of the A.V.; for though the badger is common in Israel, yet the Hebrew name "most probably" (according to 19th and early 20th century scholars) indicates the dugong (designated halicore hemprichii 1832, and halicore tabernaculi 1843), a sirenian living in the Red Sea, the skin of which is used to the present day by Bedouin Arabs for such purposes as those alluded to in the Bible. Nevertheless, this is in contradiction to Leviticus 11:10 (KJV) "And all that have not fins and scales in the seas, and in the rivers, of all that move in the waters, and of any living thing which is in the waters, they shall be an abomination unto you."  And Leviticus 11:27 says clearly (including the badger), "And whatsoever goeth upon his paws, among all manner of beasts that go on all four, those are unclean unto you:  whoso toucheth their carcase shall be unclean until the even."  Leviticus explicitly commands the Jews, "Ye shall not make yourselves abominable..." (11:41–47). Strong's Concordance BADGERS' number 8476 תחש tachash says the word is probably of foreign derivation; a (clean) animal with fur, probably a species of antelope—badger. The opinion that tahash denotes the dugong is declining in recent decades in favor of "blue-processed skins" (Navigating the Bible II) and "(blue-)beaded skins" (Anchor Bible.)
Basilisk occurs in the D.V. as an equivalent for several Hebrew names of snakes:
 Péthén (Ps. xc, 13), the cobra; had the Latin and English translators been more consistent they would have rendered this Hebrew word here, as in the other places, by asp;
 Céphá' and Cíphe 'ônî (Prov., xxiii, 32; Is., xi. 8; xiv, 29; Jer., viii, '17;
 'éphe'éh (Isaiah 59:5), a kind of viper impossible to determine, or perhaps the echis arenicola;
 flying sãrãph (Isaiah 14:29; 30:6), a winged serpent (?), possibly also a reptile like the draco fimbriatus, which, having long ribs covered with a fringe-like skin, is able to glide through the air for short distances.
Bat — The bat (עֲטַלֵּף ‘ăṭallêf), fourteen species of which still exist in Israel is reckoned among unclean "winged things" (Leviticus 11:19; Deuteronomy 14:18). Its abode is generally in dark and desolate places such as ruins and caverns.
Bear — The bear ( ḏōḇ) spoken of in the Bible is the Ursus syriacus, scarcely different from the brown bear of Europe. Since the destruction of the forests, it is now rarely seen south of Lebanon and Hermon, where it is common. Not infrequently met in the Holy Land during the Old Testament times, it was much dreaded on account of its ferocious and destructive instincts; to dare it was accordingly a mark of uncommon courage (1 Samuel 17:34–36). Its terror-striking roars and its fierceness, especially when robbed of its cubs, are repeatedly alluded to.
Beast, wild — The expression occurs twice in the D.V., but much oftener in the A.V., and R. V., where it is in several places a substitute for the awkward "beast of the field", the Hebrew name of wild animals at large. The first time we read of "wild beasts" in the D.V., it fairly stands for the Hebrew word zîz [Ps. lxxix (Hebr., lxxx), 14], albeit the "singular wild beast" is a clumsy translation. The same Hebrew word in Ps. xlix, 11, at least for consistency's sake, should have been rendered in the same manner; "the beauty of the field" must consequently be corrected into "wild beast". In Is., xiii, 21, "wild beasts" is an equivalent for the Hebr. Ciyyîm, i. e. denizens of the desert. This word in different places has been translated in divers manners: demons (Isaiah 34:14), dragons (Psalm 73:14; Jeremiah 1:39); it possibly refers to the hyena.
Bee (דְּבוֹרָה dəḇōrāh) — Israel, according to Scripture, is a land flowing with honey (Exodus 3:8). Its dry climate, its rich abundance, and variety of aromatic flowers, and its limestone rocks render it particularly adapted for bees. No wonder then that honey bees, both wild and hived, abound there. All the different species known by the names of Bombus, Nomia, Andrena, Osmia, Megachile, Anthophora, are widely spread throughout the country. The hived honey bee of Israel, Apis fasciata, belongs to a variety slightly different from ours, characterized by yellow stripes on the abdomen. Wild bees are said to live not only in rocks [Ps. lxxx (Hebr., lxxxi), 17], but in hollow trees (1 Samuel 14:25), even in dried carcasses (Judges 14:8). Syrian and Egyptian hives are made of a mash of clay and straw for coolness. In Old Testament times, honey was an article of export (Genesis 43:11; Ezekiel 27:17). Bees are spoken of in Bible as a term of comparison for a numerous army relentlessly harassing their enemies. Debôrah, the Hebrew name for bee, was a favourite name for women.
Beetle, given by A.V. (Leviticus 11:22) as an equivalent for Hebrew, árbéh (אַרְבֶּה), does not meet the requirements of the context: "Hath the legs behind longer wherewith it hoppeth upon the earth", any more than the bruchus of D.V., some species of locust, Locusta migratoria being very likely intended.
Behemoth (בְּהֵמוֹת ḇəhêmōṯ) is generally translated as "great beasts"; in its wider signification it includes all mammals living on earth, but in the stricter sense is applied to domesticated quadrupeds at large. However, in Job , where it is left untranslated and considered a proper name, it indicates a particular animal. The description of this animal has long puzzled the commentators. Many of them now admit that it represents the hippopotamus; it might possibly correspond as well to the rhinoceros.
Bird — No other classification of birds than into clean and unclean is given. The Jews, before the Babylonian captivity, had no domestic poultry except pigeons. Although many birds are mentioned, there occur few allusions to their habits. Their instinct of migration, the snaring or netting them, and the caging of song birds are referred to.
Bird, dyed — So does the English version, Jer. 12:9, wrongly interpret the Hebrew 'áyit (עַיִט). which means beast of prey, sometimes also bird of prey or vulture.
Bird, singing — This singing bird of Zephaniah 2:14, according to the D.V., owes its origin to a mistranslation of the original, which most probably should be read: "And their voice shall sing at the window"; unless by a mistake of some scribe, the word qôl, voice, has been substituted for the name of some particular bird.
Birds, speckled, Hebrew tsāḇūa‘ (צָב֤וּעַ, Jeremiah 12:9). A much discussed translation. The interpretation of the English versions, however meaningless it may seem to some, is supported by the Targum, the Syriac, and St. Jerome. In spite of these authorities many modern scholars prefer to use the word hyena, given by the Septuagint and confirmed by Sirach, xiii, 22 as well as by the Arabic (dábúh) and rabbinical Hebrew (çebhôá'), names of the hyena.
Bison, According to several authors, the re'em (רְאֵם) of the Bible. It belongs to the same genus as the aurochs, but is specifically different from  it.  The European bison (Bison bonasus) is not believed to have been present in the Bible  lands, though it did live in the Caucasus. 
Bittern (botháurus vulgaris), a shy, solitary, wading bird related to the heron and inhabiting the recesses of swamps, where its startling, booming cry at night gives a frightening impression of desolation. In the D.V., bittern stands for Hebr. qã'ãth (קָאַת, Leviticus 11:18; Isaiah 34:11; Zephaniah 2:14), although by some inconsistency the same Hebrew word is rendered , by cormorant, and Ps. ci (Hebr., cii), 7, by pelican. The pelican meets all the requirements of all the passages where qã'ãth is mentioned, and would perhaps be a better translation than bittern.
 certainly designates, a voracious insect; the Hebrew צְלָצַל tsəlātsal, "chirping", suggests that the cricket was possibly meant and might be substituted for "blast." In Psalm 78:46, blast stands for חָסִיל hãsîl, "the destroyer", perhaps the locust in its caterpillar state, in which it is most destructive.
Boar, wild — The only allusion to this animal is found Psalm 80:13 (חֲזִיר מִיָּ֑עַר ḥăzîr mîyā‘ar, "forest pig"); however, the wild boar was undoubtedly always, as it is now, common in Israel, having its lair in the woods, and most destructive to vineyards.
Bruchus — Though it occurs once (Leviticus 11:22) as an equivalent for Hebrew, 'ârbéh (probably Locusta migratoria), the word bruchus is the regular interpretation for יֶלֶק yéléq, "licker". The biblical bruchus may be fairly identified with the beetle, or some insect akin to it. Anyway, the yéléq of Jer., 51:14,27, should have been rendered in the same manner as everywhere else.
Bubale, Antilope bubalis, or Alcephalus bubalis, which should not be confounded with the bubale (water buffalo), Bos bubalus, is probably signified by the Hebrew, תְּאוֹ the'ô, interpreted by the Douay translators, wild goat, in Deut., 14:5, and wild ox, Is., li, 20. It still exists in Israel, but was formerly much more common than now.
Buffalo (Bison bonasus) — So does the D.V. translate the Hebrew, yáhmûr, III K., iv, 23 (Hebrews 1 Samuel 5:3). Being a denizen of marshy and swampy lands, the buffalo must have been scarcely known by the Hebrews. Moreover, its coarse, unpleasant-smelling flesh seems to exclude the identification with the animal referred to in the above-mentioned passage, where we should probably read roebuck.
Buffle — Another word for buffalo, D.V., Deut., xiv, 5. According to good authorities, the oryx, or white antelope, might be here intended, the Hebrew word יַחְמוּר yáhmûr possibly meaning, as its Arabic equivalent does, both the roebuck and the oryx.
Bull  (פַר par)— A symbol of fierce and relentless adversaries, Psalm 22:12.
Bullock — The bullock (עֵגֶל ‘êḡel), as yet unaccustomed to the yoke, is an image of Israel's insubordinate mind before he was subdued by the captivity (Jeremiah 31:18).
Buzzard (Hebr., רָאָה rã'ah) — Probably the ringtail of D.V. and the glede of A.V. (Deuteronomy 14:13); possibly, through a scribe's error, might be identified with the kite, דָּאָה dã'ah, of Leviticus 11:14. The buzzard, three species of which exist in Israel, has always been common there.

C
Calf ( ‘êḡel; feminine עֶגְלָה ‘eḡlāh) One of the most popular representations of the deity among the Canaanites. The calf is, in biblical poetry, a figure for vexing and pitiless foes, Psalm 111:13]. The fatted calf was a necessary feature, so to say, of a feast dinner.
Camel ( gəmal; juvenile or Dromedary בִּכְרָה biḵrāh) a prominent domestic animal of the East without the existence of which life in the Arabian deserts would be impossible. It was perhaps the first beast of burden applied to the service of man. It is mentioned as such in the biblical records as early as the time of Abraham. Recent excavations in the Timna Valley discovered what may be the earliest camel bones found in Israel or even outside the Arabian peninsula, dating to around 930 BCE. This is seen as evidence by some that the stories of Abraham, Joseph, Jacob and Esau were written after this time.
Camelopardalis, occurs only once in the D.V. (Deuteronomy 14:5), as a translation of zémér (זֶמֶר). The word, a mere transcription of the Latin and the Greek, is a combination of the names of the camel and the leopard, and indicates the giraffe. But this translation, as well as that of the A.V. (chamois), is doubtless erroneous; neither the giraffe nor the chamois ever lived in Israel. The wild sheep or mouflon, which still lingers in Cyprus and Arabia Petraea, is very likely intended.
Cankerworm, the locust in its larva state, in which it is most voracious. So does A.V. render the Hebrew, gãzám (גָּזָם); the word palmerworm (Dichomeris ligulella), given by the D.V. seems better.
Cat — Mention of this animal occurs not once in the Protestant Bible. It is mentioned in Baruch 6:21. The cat was very familiar to the Egyptians, it seems to have been known to the Jews, as well as to the Assyrians and Babylonians, even to the Greeks and Romans before the conquest of Egypt.
Cattle — Very early in the history of mankind, animals were tamed and domesticated, to be used in agriculture, for milk, for their flesh, and especially for sacrifices. Many words in Hebrew expressed the different ages and sexes of cattle, West of the Jordan River the cattle were generally stall-fed; in the plains and hills south and east they roamed in a half-wild state; such were the most famous "bulls of Bashan".
Cerastes (Hebr., שְׁפִיפֹן shephîphõn) should be substituted in D.V. for the colourless "serpent", Gen. 49:17. The identification of the shephîphõn with the deadly horned cerastes (Cerastes hasselquistii) is evidenced by the Arabic name of the latter (shúffon), and its customs in perfect agreement with the indications of the Bible. The cerastes, one of the most venomous of snakes, is in the habit of coiling itself in little depressions such as camels' footmarks, and suddenly darting on any passing animal.
Chameleon  — Mentioned Lev. 11:30, with the mole (Hebr., תַּנְשֶׁמֶת tínshéméth). In spite of the authority of the ancient translations, it is now generally admitted that the tínshéméth is the chameleon, very common in Israel; whereas the כֹּחַ kôâh is a kind of large lizard, perhaps the land monitor (Psammosaurus scincus).
Chamois (Rupicapra rupicapra) is now totally unknown in western Asia, where it very probably never existed. The opinion of those who see it in the Hebrew zémér (זֶמֶר, Deuteronomy 14:5) should consequently be entirely discarded (see ).
Charadrion (Hebrew אֲנָפָה ’ănāp̄āh, Leviticus 11:19; Deuteronomy 14:18) would be the plover; but it rather stands here for the heron, all the species of which (this is the sense of the expression "according to its kind"), numerous in Israel, should be deemed unclean.
Cherogrillus (Leviticus 11:5; Deuteronomy 14:7), a mere transliteration of the Greek name of the porcupine, corresponds to the Hebrew שָׁפָן shãphãn, translated in Psalm 103:18, as irchin, and in Proverbs 30:26, as rabbit. As St. Jerome noticed it, the shãphãn is not the porcupine, but a very peculiar animal of about the same size, dwelling among the rocks, and in holes, and called in Israel "bear-rat", on account of some resemblance with these two quadrupeds. We call it coney, or daman (Hyrax syriacus). Its habit of lingering among the rocks is alluded to, Psalm 103:18; its wisdom and defencelessness, Proverbs 30:24–26. "It cannot burrow, for it has no claws, only nails half developed ; but it lies in holes in the rocks, and feeds only at dawn and dusk, always having sentries posted, at the slightest squeak from which the whole party instantly disappears. The coney is not a ruminant (cf. Leviticus 11:5), but it sits working its jaws as if re-chewing. It is found sparingly in most of the rocky districts, and is common about Sinai" (Tristram).
Cobra (Naja haje), most likely the deadly snake called פֶתֶן péthén by the Hebrews, found in Israel and Egypt and used by serpent-charmers.
Cochineal  ( šənî; Coccus ilicis) — A hemiptera homoptera insect very common on the Syrian holm-oak, from the female of which the crimson dye kermes is prepared. The complete name in Hebrew is equivalent to "scarlet insect", the "insect" being not infrequently omitted in the translations.
Cock, Hen — Domestic poultry are not mentioned till after the Babylonian captivity is what some believe but others understand the "seal of Jaazaniah" from the ruins of the biblical Judean kingdom at Mizpah, with the inscription of "belonging to Jaazaniah, servant to the king" to carry the insignia of a rooster "in fighting stance" for spiritual purposes based on Proverbs 30, with similar illustrations of "cocks in fighting stance" found within the Vivian Bible. In Jesus' time domestic poultry, introduced from India through Persia, had become common, and their well-known habits gave rise to familiar expressions, and afforded good and easy illustrations (Mark 13:35; 14:30, etc.). Jesus Christ compared His care for Jerusalem to that of a hen for her brood, or more accurately an ornis, a bird, specifically a rooster or hen. The three times the word 'cock' appears in the D.V. it is owing to a misinterpretation of the primitive text, according to some, but to others in the context of a religious instilling vessel of "a girt one of the loins" (Young's Literal Translation) that which is "stately in his stride" and "move with stately bearing" within the Book of Proverbs 30:29–31, Saadiah ben Yosef Gaon (Saadia Gaon) identifies the definitive trait of "a cock girded about the loins" within Proverbs 30:31(DV) as "the honesty of their behavior and their success", identifying a spiritual purpose of a religious vessel within that religious and spiritual instilling schema.
 Job 38:36, the word sékhwi (שֶׂכְוִי) means soul, heart: "Who hath put wisdom in the heart of man? and who gave his soul understanding?", but also "Sekvi means 'rooster' according to the Sages" and hence "Who hath put wisdom in the heart of man? or who gave the cock understanding?"(DV).
 , zãrzîr (זַרְזִיר) should be translated as "hero" according to some, but to others as "a cock girded about the loins" or "a girt one of the loins"(Young's Literal Translation), "which most of the old translations and Rabbis understood to be a fighting cock".
 , where the word gébhér (גֶּבֶר), great, strong man, has been rendered according to some rabbinical conceptions, but also the Hebrew word gever was used to mean a "rooster" in addition to the meaning of "man, strong man".
Cockatrice — A fabulous serpent supposed to be produced from a cock's egg brooded by a serpent; it was alleged that its hissing would drive away all other serpents, and that its breath, even its look, was fatal. The word is used in A.V. as the regular equivalent for Hebrew צֶפַע tsif‘ōnî.
Colt — See .
Coney — See .
Coral, Hebrew רָאמָה rãmôth, should probably be substituted, Job, 28:18, for "eminent things", and Ezekiel 27:16, for "silk" in the D.V. The coral dealt with at Tyre was that of the Red Sea or even of the Indian Ocean; coral seems to have been scarcely known among the Jews.
Cormorant (Leviticus 11:17; Deuteronomy 14:17), very frequently met with on the coasts, rivers, and lakes of Israel, probably corresponds to the shãlãk (שָׁלָךְ) of the Hebrew, although this name, which means "the plunger", might be applied to some other plunging bird.
Cow — See .
Crane (Grus grus) — The word does not occur in D.V., but seems the best translation of Hebrew עָגוּר, ‘āḡūr, read in two passages: Is. 38:14, and Jer. 8:7, where its loud voice and migratory instincts are alluded to. There is little doubt that the two above indicated places of D.V., where we read "swallow", should be corrected.
Cricket, a good translation for Hebrew צְלָצַל tsəlātsal, "chirping", which besides the feature suggested by the etymology, is described Deut. 28:42, as a voracious insect. See .
Crocodile — We do not read this word in any other place than Lev. 11:29 (D.V.), where it corresponds to the Hebrew, צָב tsāḇ; the animal is, nevertheless, oftener spoken of in the Holy Books under cover of several metaphors: רַהַב ráhâb, "the proud" (Isaiah 51:9); תנין tánnîn, "the stretcher" (Ezekiel 29:3); לִוְיָתָן líweyãthãn (leviathan) [Ps. lxxiii (Hebr., lxxiv), 14; Job, xl, 20, xli, 25]. See . The Nile crocodile (Crocodylus niloticus) is still found in great numbers in the upper Nile, and its range extended into present-day Israel until the early 20th century. A remarkable description of the crocodile has been drawn by the author of the Book of Job. He depicts the difficulty of capturing, snaring, or taming him, his vast size, his impenetrable scales, his flashing eyes, his snorting, and his immense strength. Dreadful as he is, the crocodile was very early regarded and worshipped as a deity by the Egyptians. He is, in the Bible, the emblem of the people of Egypt and their Pharaoh, sometimes even of all Israel's foes.
Cuckoo, according to some, would be the bird called in Hebrew שַׁחַף shâhâph (Leviticus ; Deuteronomy ), and there reckoned among the unclean birds. Two species, Cuculus canorus and Oxylophus glandarius live in the Holy Land; however there is little probability that the cuckoo is intended in the mentioned passages, where we should perhaps see the shearwater and the various species of seagulls.

D

Deer — (Hebr., אַיָּל ’ayyāl, female אַיָּלָה ayyālāh). Its name is frequently read in the Scriptures, and its habits have afforded many allusions or comparisons, which fact supposes that the deer was not rare in Israel. Its handsome form, its swiftness, its shyness, the love of the roe for her fawns, are alluded to; it seems from Prov., v, 19 and some other indirect indications that the words 'áyyãl and 'áyyãlah (deer and hind) were terms of endearment most familiar between lovers.
Demons (Isaiah 34:14) — So does D.V., translate צִיִּים֙ tsîyîm; it is certainly a mistake. The word at issue is generally believed to refer to the hyena (Hyaena hyaena), still found everywhere in caves and tombs
Dispas — The D.V., following the Vulgate (Deuteronomy 8:15) thereby means a serpent whose bite causes a mortal thirst; but this interpretation seems to come from a misunderstanding suggested by the Septuagint; the original writer most likely intended there to mean "drought" (צִמָּאוֹן tsimmā’ōn, "thirsty ground"), as the A.V. rightly puts it, and not any kind of serpent.
Dog — The dog ( keleḇ) in the East does not enjoy the companionship and friendship of man as in the western countries. Its instinct has been cultivated only insofar as the protecting of the flocks and camps against wild animals is concerned. In the towns and villages it roams in the streets and places, of which it is the ordinary scavenger; packs of dogs in a half-wild state are met with in the cities and are not infrequently dangerous for men. For this reason the dog has always been, and is still looked upon with loathing and aversion, as filthy and unclean. With a very few exceptions, whenever the dog is spoken of in the Bible (where it is mentioned over 40 times), it is with contempt, to remark either its voracious instincts and eating its own vomit; it was regarded as the emblem of lust, and of uncleanness in general.  A greyhound is mentioned in Proverbs 30:31. Jesus refers to dogs in positive light in the New Testament and a symbol of great faith and humbleness in Matthew 15:21-28 and Mark 7:24-30. "But He answered and said, 'It is not good to take the children’s bread and throw it to the little dogs.' And she said, 'Yes, Lord, yet even the little dogs eat the crumbs which fall from their masters’ table.' Then Jesus answered and said to her, 'O woman, great is your faith! Let it be to you as you desire.' And her daughter was healed from that very hour."
Dove (Hebr., יוֹנָה yônah) — Though distinguishing it from tôr, the turtle-dove, the Jews were perfectly aware of their natural affinity and speak of them together. The dove is mentioned in the Bible more often than any other bird (over 50 times); this comes both from the great number of doves flocking in Israel, and of the favour they enjoy among the people. The dove is first spoken of in the record of the flood (Genesis 8:8–12); later on we see that Abraham offered up some in sacrifice, which would indicate that the dove was very early domesticated. In fact several allusions are made to dove-cotes, with their "windows" or latticed openings. But in olden times as well as now, besides the legions of pigeons that swarm around the villages, there were many more rock-doves, "doves of the valleys", as they are occasionally termed (Ezekiel 7:16; Song of Songs 2:14; Jeremiah 48:28), that filled the echoes of the mountain gorges with the rustling of their wings. The metallic lustre of their plumage, the swiftness of their flight, their habit of sweeping around in flocks, their plaintive coo, are often alluded to by the different sacred writers. The dark eye of the dove, encircled by a line of bright red skin, is also mentioned; its gentleness and innocence made it the type of trust and love, and, most naturally, its name was one of the most familiar terms of endearment. Jesus spoke of the dove as a symbol of simplicity; the sum of its perfections made it a fitting emblem for the Holy Spirit.
Dragon, a word frequently found in the translations of the Bible as substitute, so it seems, for other names of animals that the translators were unable to identify. It stands indeed for several Hebrew names:
 תַנִּ֑ thán (Job 30:29; Isaiah 34:13; 35:7; 43:20; Jeremiah 9:11; 10:22; 14:6; 49:33; 51:37; Micah 1:8; Malachi 1:3), unquestionably meaning a denizen of desolate places, and generally identified with the jackal;
 תנין tánnîn, in a few passages with the sense of serpent [Deuteronomy 32:33; Psalm xc (Hebr., xci), 13; Dan., xiv, 22-27], in others most likely signifying the crocodile [Ps., lxxiii (Hebr., lxxiv), 13; Isaiah 51:9; Ezekiel 29:3], or even a sea-monster (Ezekiel 32:2), such as a whale, porpoise, or dugong, as rightly translated in Lam., iv, 3, and as probably intended in Ps., cxlviii, 7;
 לִוְיָתָן líweyãthãn (leviathan), meaning both the crocodile [Ps., lxxiii (Hebr., lxxiv), 14] and sea-monster [Ps. ciii (Hebr., civ), 26];
 צִיִּים֙ tsîyîm (Psalm 73:14; Jeremiah 1:39), which possibly means the hyena.
The author of the Apocalypse repeatedly makes mention of the dragon, by which he means "the old serpent, who is called the Devil and Satan, who seduceth the whole world" (etc.). Of the fabulous dragon fancied by the ancients, represented as a monstrous winged serpent with a crested head and enormous claws, and regarded as very powerful and ferocious, no mention is found in the Bible. See , 4.
Dromedary — Hebrew: , biḵrāh, in Isaiah 60:6, signifies "a swift and finely bred camel".
Dugong — See .

E
Eagle — So is generally rendered the Hebrew, נֶשֶׁר néshér, but there is a doubt as to whether the eagle or some kind of vulture is intended. It seems even probable that the Hebrews did not distinguish very carefully these different large birds of prey, and that all are spoken of as though they were of one kind. Anyway, four species of eagles are known to live in Israel: Aquila chrysaetos, Clanga pomarina, Aquila heliaca, and Circaetus gallicus. Many allusions are made to the eagle in the Bible: its inhabiting the dizziest cliffs for nesting, its keen sight, its habit of congregating to feed on the slain, its swiftness, its longevity, its remarkable care in training its young, are often referred to (see in particular Job 39:27-30). When the relations of Israel with their neighbours became more frequent, the eagle became, under the pen of the Jewish prophets and poets, an emblem first of the Assyrian, then of the Babylonian, and finally of the Persian kings.
Elephant — We learn from Assyrian inscriptions that before the Hebrews settled in Syria, there existed elephants in that country, and Tiglath-Pileser I tells us about his exploits in elephant hunting. We do not read, however, of elephants in the Bible until the Maccabean times. True, III Kings speaks of ivory, or "[elephants'] teeth", as the Hebrew text puts it, yet not as indigenous, but as imported from Ophir. In the post-exilian times, especially in the books of the Maccabees, elephants are frequently mentioned; they were an important element in the armies of the Seleucids. These animals were imported either from India or from Africa.
Ericus, a Latin name of the hedgehog, preserved in the D.V. as a translation of the Hebrew word קִפוֹד qíppôdh (Isaiah 14:23; 34:11; Zephaniah 2:14, the word urchin has been used) and קִפוֹז qîppôz (Isaiah 34:15). The above identification of the qíppôdh is based both on the Greek rendering and the analogy between this Hebrew word and the Talmudic (qúppádh), Syriac (qufdô'), Arabic (qúnfúd) and Ethiopian (qinfz) names of the hedgehog. Several scholars, however, discard this identification, because the hedgehog, contrary to the qíppôdh, lives neither in marshes nor ruins, and has no voice. The bittern meets all the requirements of the texts where the qíppôdh is mentioned. It should be noticed nevertheless that hedgehogs are far from rare in Israel. As to the qîppôz of Is. 34:15, read qíppôdh by some Hebrew Manuscripts, and interpreted accordingly by the Septuagint, Vulgate and the versions derived therefrom, its identity is a much discussed question. Some, arguing from the authorities just referred to, confound it with the qíppôdh, whereas others deem it to be the arrow-snake; but besides that no such animal as arrow-snake is known to naturalists, the context seems to call for a bird.
Ewe  ( rəḥêl) — In Hebrew, six names at least, with their feminines, express the different stages of development of the sheep. Its domestication goes back to the night of time, so that the early traditions enshrined in the Bible speak of the first men as shepherds. Whatever may be thought of this point, it is out of question that from the dawn of historical times down to our own, flocks have constituted the staple of the riches of the land. The ewe of Israel is generally the ovis laticaudata, the habits of which, resembling those of all other species of sheep, are too well known to be here dwelt upon. Let it suffice to notice that scores of allusions are made in the Holy Books to these habits as well as to the different details of the pastoral life.

F
Falcon — See .
Fallow-deer (Cervus dama or Dama vulgaris). The fallow-deer is scarce in the Holy Land and found only north of Mount Thabor. If it is mentioned at all in the Bible, it is probably ranked among the deer.
Faun — An equivalent in D.V. (Jeremiah 1:39), after St. Jerome, for Hebrew, 'íyyîm. St. Jerome explains that they were wild beings, denizens of deserts and woods, with a hooked nose, a horned forehead, and goat feet. He translated the Hebrew as fig-faun, adding to the original the adjective ficarii, possibly following in this the pagan idea which, supposing that figs incline to lust, regarded fig-groves a well fitted abode for fauns. The same Hebrew word is rendered in Is., xiii, 22 as owls, and in Is., xxxiv, 14, as monsters, which shows a great perplexity on the part of the translators. The true meaning, being "howlers", seems to point out the jackal, called the "howler" by the Arabs.
Fawn (Proverbs 5:19), for Hebrew, yá'alah, feminine of yã'el which should be regularly, as it is in several passages, rendered by wild goat (ibex syriacus). See .
Fish — Fish are mentioned extensively in the Bible, although no particular species is named. Fishermen are mentioned in both Old and New Testaments, including several of Jesus' followers. The biblical fish category includes marine mammals. ("Even the sea monsters draw out the breast, they give suck to their young ones..." Lamentations 4:3 A.V. & D.V.) Jonah's fish: According to the Book of Jonah, a "great fish" swallowed the prophet Jonah (Jonah 1:17 A.V.), and he was in its belly for three days, before being vomited up. Matthew 12:40 refers to it as a whale.
Flea, spoken of I K., xxiv, 15; xxvi, 20, as the most insignificant cause of trouble that may befall a man.
Flock — The flocks of Israel include generally both sheep and goats: "The sheep eat only the fine herbage, whereas the goats browse on what the sheep refuse. They pasture and travel together in parallel columns, but seldom intermingle more closely, and at night they always classify themselves. The goats are for the most part black, the sheep white, dappled or piebald, forming a very marked contrast..." (Tristram). The shepherd usually leads the flock, calling the sheep by their names from time to time; in his footsteps follows an old he-goat, whose stately bearing affords to the natives matter for several comparisons; the Arabs, indeed to this day, call a man of stately mien a "he-goat". The shepherd at sunset waters his flock, folds them ordinarily in some of the many caves found on every hillside, and with trained dogs guards them at night.
Fly — Two Hebrew words are thus translated:
 'ãrõbh is the name of the Egyptian fly of the fourth plague; this name, a collective one, though translated as dog-fly in the Septuagint, seems to signify all kinds of flies. Flies are at all times an almost insufferable nuisance; the common house-fly, with the gnat, vexes men, while gad-flies of every description tsetse, œstru, hippoboscida, tabanus marocanus, etc., infest animals.
 Zebhûbh is likewise the collective name of the Israeli fly, but more specifically of the gad-fly.
Though a trifle less annoying than in Egypt, flies were, however, deemed a plague severe enough in Israel to induce the natives to have recourse to the power of a special god, Bá'ál-zebhûbh, the master of the flies, that they and their cattle be protected against that scourge.
Fowl — This word which, in its most general sense, applies to anything that flies in the air (Genesis 1:20, 21), including the "bat" and "flying creeping things" (Leviticus 11:19-23 A.V.), and which frequently occurs in the Bible with this meaning, is also sometimes used in a narrower sense, as, for instance, III K., iv, 23, where it stands for all fatted birds that may be reckoned among the delicacies of a king's table; so likewise Gen., xv, 11 and Is., xviii, 6, where it means birds of prey in general. In this latter signification allusions are made to their habit of perching on bare or dead trees, or of flocking together in great numbers.
Fox — Thus is usually rendered the Hebrew, shû'ãl, which signifies both fox and jackal, even the latter more often than the former. The fox, however, was well known by the ancient Hebrews, and its cunning was as proverbial among them as among us (Ezekiel 13:4; Luke 13:32).
Frog — Though not rare in Israel, this word is only mentioned in the Old Testament in connection with the second plague of Egypt. Two species of frogs are known to live in the Holy Land: the rana esculenta, or common edible frog, and the hyla arborea, or green tree-frog. The former throngs wherever there is water. In Apoc., xvi, 13, the frog is the emblem of unclean spirits.

G
Gazelle (Hebr., çebî, i. e. beauty) has been known at all times as one of the most graceful of all animals. Several species still exist in Israel. Its different characteristics, its beauty of form, its swiftness, its timidity, the splendour and meekness of its eye, are in the present time, as well as during the age of the Old Testament writers, the subjects of many comparisons. However, the name of the gazelle is scarcely, if at all, to be found in the Bible; in its stead we read roe, hart, or deer. Like a few other names of graceful and timid animals, the word gazelle has always been in the East a term of endearment in love. It was also a woman's favourite name (1 Chronicles 8:9; 2 Kings 12:1; 2 Chronicles 24:1; Acts 9:36).
Gecko — Probable translation of the 'anãqah of the Hebrews, generally rendered in our versions by shrew-mouse, for which it seems it should be substituted. The gecko, ptyodactylus gecko of the naturalists, is common in Israel.
Gier-eagle — So does A.V. render the Hebrew, rãhãm (Leviticus 11:18) or rãhãmah (Deuteronomy 14:17). By the gier-eagle, the Egyptian vulture (neophron percnopterus), or Pharao's hen, is generally believed to be signified. However, whether this bird should be really recognized in the Hebrew, rãhãm, is not easy to decide; for while, on the one hand, the resemblance of the Arabic name for the Egyptian vulture with the Hebrew word rãhãm seems fairly to support the identification, the mention of the rãhãm in a list of wading birds, on the other hand, casts a serious doubt on its correctness.
Giraffe — See . Probably the תחשׁ (taḥash). (Numbers 4:5-15). Mistranslated as badger or dolphin.
Gnat — The same insect called sciniph in Ex., viii, 16, 17 and Ps. civ (Hebr., cv), 31, and known under the familiar name of mosquito, Culex pipiens, is taken in the New Testament as an example of a trifle.
Goat — Though the sacred writers spoke of the ewe more frequently than of the goat, yet with the latter they were very well acquainted. It was indeed, especially in the hilly regions east of the Jordan, an important item in the wealth of the Israelites. The goat of Israel, particularly the capra membrica, affords numerous illustrations and allusions, Its remarkably long ears are referred to by Amos, iii, 12; its glossy dark hair furnishes a graphic comparison to the author of Cant., iv, 1; vi, 4; this hair was woven into a strong cloth; the skin tanned with the hair on served to make bottles for milk, wine, oil, water, etc. The kid was an almost essential part of a feast. The goat is mentioned in Dan., viii, 5, as the symbol of the Macedonian empire. The grand Gospel scene of the separation of the just and the wicked on the last day is borrowed from the customs of the shepherds in the East. See also: 
Goat, wild, Job, xxxix, 1; I K., xxiv, 3, where it is an equivalent for yã' él, translated in Ps., ciii (Hebr., Civ), 18, as hart and in Prov., v, 19, as fawn, is most probably the ibex syriacus, a denizen of the rocky summits [Ps. ciii (Hebr., civ), 18]. It was regarded as a model of grace (Proverbs 5:19), and its name, Jahel, Jahala, was frequently given to persons (Judges 5:6; Ezra 2:56, etc.).
Grasshopper, is probably the best rendering for the Hebrew, hãgãb [Lev.11:22; Num. 13:34 (Hebrews 13:33); Isaiah 40:22; Eccles. 12:5, etc.], as in the A.V., if the Hebrew word be interpreted "hopper" as  suggests; the D.V. uses the word locust. The grasshopper is one of the smaller species of the locust tribe.
Griffon — So D.V., Lev. 11:13 (whereas Deuteronomy , we read "grype") translates the Hebrew, pérés, the "breaker" whereby the lammergeyer or bearded vulture, gypœtus barbatus, the largest and most magnificent of the birds of prey is probably intended. The opinion that the Bible here speaks of the fabulous griffon, i.e. a monster begotten from a lion and an eagle, and characterized by the beak, neck, and wings of an eagle and the legs and rump of a lion, is based only on a misinterpretation of the word.
Griffon vulture, a probable translation in several cases of the Hebrew, néshér, regularly rendered by eagle. This most majestic bird (Gyps fulvus), the type, as it seems, of the eagle-headed figures of Assyrian sculpture, is most likely referred to in Mich., i, 16, on account of its bare neck and head.
Grype, . See .

H
Haje — See .
Hare — Mentioned Lev., xi, 6; Deut., xiv, 7, in the list of the unclean quadrupeds. Several subspecies of the European hare and the Cape hare live in Israel: Lepus europaeus syriacus in the north; Lepus europaeus judeae in the south and the Jordan valley, together with Lepus capensis sinaiticus, Lepus capensis aegyptius and Lepus capensis isabellinus, The statement of the Bible that the hare "cheweth the cud" is a classical difficulty. It should be noticed that this is not the reason why the hare is reckoned among the unclean animals; but the cause thereof should be sought for in the fact that though it chews the cud, which certainly it appears to do, it does not divide the hoof.
Hart and hind — Either the fallow-deer, still occasionally found in the Holy Land, or the red deer, now extinct, or the deer generally. It has afforded many illustrations to time biblical writers and poets, especially by its fleetness (Song of Songs 2:9; Isaiah 35:6), its sure-footedness [Ps. xvii (Hebr., xviii), 34; Hab., iii, 19], its affection (Proverbs 5:19), and its habit of hiding its young (Job 39:1).
Hawk (Hebr., neç) is, in the Scriptures, a general denomination including, with the falcon, all the smaller birds of prey, the kestrel, merlin, sparrowhawk, hobby, and others, most common in Israel.
Night hawk, A.V. for Hebrew, táhmãs, more exactly translated in D.V. as owl; some bird of the latter kind is indeed undoubtedly intended, probably the barn owl (strix flammea).
Sparrow hawk (Accipiter nisus), one of the hawks of Israel, so common that it might be regarded, in reference to the Bible, as the hawk par excellence.
Hedgehog — See .
Hen, See .
Heron — Mentioned Lev., xi, 19, in the list of unclean birds, but probably in the wrong place in the D.V.; heron, indeed, should be substituted for charadrion, whereas in the same verse it stands for stork, as the A.V. correctly states it.
Hind — See .
Hippopotamus — See .
Hobby (falco subbuteo). See .
Hoopoe — See .
Hornet (Hebr., çíre'ah; vespa crabro) — One of the largest and most pugnacious wasps; when disturbed they attack cattle and horses; their sting is very severe, capable not only of driving men and cattle to madness, but even of killing them (Exodus 23:28; Deuteronomy 7:20; Joshua 24:12).
Horse — The horse is never mentioned in Scripture in connection with the patriarchs; the first time the Bible speaks of it, it is in reference to the Egyptian army pursuing the Hebrews, During the epoch of the conquest and of Judges, we hear of horses only with the Chanaanean troops, and later on with the Philistines, The hilly country inhabited by the Israelites was not favourable to the use of the horse; this is the reason why the Bible speaks of horses only in connection with war. David and Solomon established a cavalry and chariot force; but even this, used exclusively for wars of conquest, seems to have been looked upon as a dangerous temptation to kings, for the Deuteronomy legislation forbids them to multiply horses for themselves. The grand description of the war horse in Job is classical; it will be noticed, however, that its praises are more for the strength than for the swiftness of the horse. The prophet Zacharias depicts (ix, 10) the Messianic age as one in which no hostilities will be heard of; then all warlike apparel being done away with, the horse will serve only for peaceful use.
Houp (Leviticus 11:19; Deuteronomy 14:18) — The analogy of the Hebrew with Syriac and Coptic for the name of this bird makes the identification doubtless, although some, after the example of the A.V., see in the Hebrew dûkhîpháth, the lapwing. The Egyptians worshipped the houp and made it the emblem of Horus.
Striped hyena — This word is not to be found in any of the English translations of the Bible; it occurs twice in the Septuagint, Jer., xii, 9, and Ecclus., xiii, 22, being in both places the rendering for the Hebrew name çãbhûá. The hyenas are very numerous in the Holy Land, where they are most active scavengers; they feed upon dead bodies, and sometimes dig the tombs open to get at the corpses therein buried. Two Hebrew names are supposed to designate the hyena:
 çãbhûá'. This word, which has been interpreted "speckled bird", Jer., xii, 9, by modern translators following the Vulgate, has been rendered by "holy man", Ecclus., xiii, 22. Despite the authorities that favour the above-mentioned translation of Jer., xii, 9, the consistency of the Septuagint on the one hand, and on the other the parallelism in the latter passage, in addition to the analogy with the Arabic and rabbinical Hebrew names for the hyena, fairly support the identification of the çãbhûá' with this animal.
 çíyyím, rendered in divers manners in different places: wild beasts, Is., xiii, 21; demons, Is., xxxiv, 14; dragons, Ps. lxxiii (hebr., lxxiv), 14; Jer., 1, 39.

I
Ibex — See  and 
Ibis — The word occurs twice in the D.V. (Leviticus ; Isaiah ) as an equivalent for yánshûph; some good authorities, however, though the yánshûph is mentioned among wading birds, do not admit the above identification and think that the Egyptian eagle-owl (Bubo ascalaphus), which they term great owl, is spoken of. The ibis was worshipped by the Egyptians as the emblem of Thoth.
Ichneumon — See .
Irchin — D.V. . See .

J
Jackal — Frequently alluded to in Bible, though the name is read neither in the D.V. nor in any of the western translations, probably because the animal, however common in Africa and south-western Asia is unknown in European countries. The name regularly substituted for jackal is fox. The jackal seems to be designated in Hebrew by three different names: shû'ãl, "the digger"; 'íyyîm, "the howlers"; and tãn, "the stretcher", although we are unable to state the differences marked by these three names, numerous references may be found throughout the Bible to the jackal's howlings and gregarious habits. The most likely species mentioned is the golden jackal, which is the only jackal to live in the Middle East.
Jerboa — This little animal, at least four species of which abide in Syria, is nowhere nominally mentioned in the Bible; it must, nevertheless, very probably be reckoned among the unclean animals indicated under the general name of mouse.

K
The remark of Job , strikingly points out the Tinnulus cenchris, one of the Israeli kestrels.
Kid — See .
Kind — See .
Kine — See .
Kite — As suggested by the analogy with the Arabic, the black kite (Milvus migrans) is probably meant by Hebr. dã'ah or dáyyah (Leviticus ; Deuteronomy ; Isaiah ), interpreted kite in the D.V.; it is one of the most common of the scavenger birds of prey of the country, and for this reason, is carefully protected by the villagers. Other kinds of kites, in particular the Milvus regalis, are common in Israel.

L
Lamb — The Paschal Lamb was both a commemoration of the deliverance from the bondage in Egypt, and a prophetic figure of the Son of God sacrificed to free His people from their slavery to sin and death. See .
Lamia (Isaiah 34:14) — Is a translation of Hebrew, lîlîth; according to the old popular legends, the lamia was a feminine bloodthirsty monster, devouring men and children. In the above cited place, some kind of owl, either the screech or the hooting owl, is very probably meant.
Lammergeyer (gypœtus barbatus) very likely signified by the Hebrew, pérés, translated as griffon in D.V.
Larus — Lev., xi; 16; Deut., xiv, 15. See .
Horse-leech (Proverbs 30:15) — Both the medicinal leech and the horse-leech are frequently found in the streams, pools, and wells; they often attach themselves to the inside of the lips and nostrils of drinking animals, thereby causing them much pain.
Leopard — Under this name come a certain number of carnivorous animals more or less resembling the real leopard (felis leopardus), namely felis jubata, felis lynx, felis uncia, etc., all formerly numerous throughout Israel, and even now occasionally found, especially in the woody districts. The leopard is taken by the biblical writers as a type of cunning (Jeremiah 5:6; Hosea 13:7), of fierceness, of a conqueror's sudden swoop (Dan., vii, 6; Hab., i, 8). Its habit of lying in wait by a well or a village is repeatedly alluded to.
Leviathan — The word Leviathan (Hebrew, líweyãthãn), which occurs six times in the Hebrew Bible, seems to have puzzled ancient translators. The D.V. has kept this name, Job, iii, 8; xl, 20; Is., xxvii, 1; it is rendered by dragon Ps. lxxiii (Hebr., lxxiv), 14, and ciii (Hebr., civ), 26; The word leviathan means a sea-monster in Isaiah 27:1); Job 41
Lion — Now extinct in Israel and in the surrounding countries, the lion was common there during the Old Testament times; hence the great number of words in the Hebrew language to signify it; under one or another of these names it is mentioned 130 times in the Scriptures, as the classical symbol of strength, power, courage, dignity, ferocity. Very likely as the type of power, it became the ensign of the tribe of Judah; so was it employed by Solomon in the decoration of the temple and of the king's house. For the same reason, Apoc., v, 5, represents Jesus Christ as the lion of the tribe of Juda. The craft and ferocity of the lion, on the other hand, caused it to be taken as an emblem of Satan (1 Peter 5:8) and of the enemies of the truth (2 Timothy 4:17).
Lizard — Immense is the number of these reptiles in Israel; no less than 44 species are found there, Among those mentioned in the Bible we may cite:
 The Letã'ah, general name of the lizard, applied especially to the common lizard, the green lizard, the blindworm, etc.;
 the chõmét, or sand lizard;
 the çãb, or dább of the Arabs (Uromastix spinipes);
 the kõâh, the divers kinds of monitor (psammosaurus scincus, hydrosaurus niloticus, etc.);
 the 'anãqah or gecko;
 the semãmîth or stellio.
Locust — One of the worst scourges of the East, very often referred to in Bible. As many as nine Hebrew words signify either the locust in general or some species:
 'árbéh, probably the locusta migratoria;
 gãzãm, possibly the locust in its larva state, the palmerworm;
 Gôbh, the locust in general;
 chagab, most likely the grasshopper;
 hãsîl, "the destroyer", perhaps the locust in its hopper state, in which it is most destructive;
 hárgõl, translated in the D.V. as ophiomachus;
 yéléq, the stinging locust;
 çelãçâl possibly the cricket; and
 sôl'ãm, rendered by attacus, or bald locust (probably the truxalis).
Unlike other insects, locusts are most voracious in every stage of their existence.

Louse — According to some this species of vermin was one of the features of the third Egyptian plague. It is but too common through all eastern countries.

M
Mildew — A word occurring a certain number of times in the D.V. as an equivalent for Hebrew, hãsîl, which probably means a kind of locust.
Mole — Two Hebrew words are thus rendered, The first, tînshéméth (Leviticus 11:30), would, according to good authorities, rather signify the chameleon; with the second, haphárperôth (Isaiah 2:20), some burrowing animal is undoubtedly intended, The mole of Syria is not the common mole of Europe, Talpa europaea, but a blind mole rat (Spalax typhlus), a blind burrowing rodent.
Monkey — See .  Occurs in 1 Kings 10:22 (NKJV).
Mosquito — See .
Moth — Is in the D.V. besides Is., xiv, 11, where it stands for rímmah, "worms", the common rendering for two words: 'ãsh (Job 4:19), and sãs (Isaiah 51:8), the exact meaning of the former is uncertain, whereas by the latter the clothes moth is meant.
Mouflon — See .
Mouse — This word seems to be a general one, including the various rats, dormice, jerboas, and hamsters, about twenty-five species of which exist in the country.
Mule — In spite of the enactment of the Law (Leviticus 19:19), the Israelites early in the course of their history possessed mules; these animals, in a hilly region such as the Holy Land, were for many purposes preferable to horses and stronger than asses; they were employed both for domestic and warlike use.

N
Night-hawk — See .

O

Oryx — See .
Osprey (Hebr. עָזְנִיָּה ‘āzənîyāh) — The fishing eagle, which name probably signifies all the smaller eagles.
Ossifrage — See .
Ostrich — Still occasionally found in the southeastern deserts of Israel, the ostrich, if we are to judge from the many mentions made of it, was well known among the Hebrews. The beauty of its plumage, its fleetness, its reputed stupidity, its leaving its eggs on the sand and hatching them by the sun's heat are repeatedly alluded to. Know in Hebrew as יָעֵן (ya‘ên) or as רֶנֶנִ֥ (rənān, "[bird of] piercing cries"). The word תַּחְמָס (taḥmās) may refer to a male ostrich, but is also conjectured as "owl" or "swallow."
Owl — A generic name under which many species of nocturnal birds are designated, some having a proper name in the Hebrew (יַנְשׁוּף yanšōp̄, אֹחַ ’ōḥ, כּוֺס kōs), some others possessing none.
Ox — See .
Ox, wild, Is., hi, 20, probably Antilope bubalis. See .

P

Palmerworm (Hebr., gãzãm) A general word for the locust, very likely in its larva state.
Two kinds of partridges are known to abide in the hilly resorts of Israel; the francolin inhabits the plains, and various sandgrouse are found in the deserts.
Peacock — The texts where it is spoken of (1 Kings ; 2 Chronicles ) clearly indicate that it was not indigenous to Israel, but imported, probably from India.
Pelican, D.V.,  (Vulgate: Psalm 101), for Hebr. qã'áth, in other places is rendered by bittern, for which it might be advantageously substituted. Pelicans are usually found about marshes (Isaiah ), and are in the habit of sitting for hours in sandy desolate places  (Vulgate: Psalm 101); Soph., ii, 14] after they have gorged.
Phœnix or chol might possibly be read instead of palmtree (Hebr. hôl) in Job , where the belief in its immortality seems referred to; however the sense adopted by D.V., after Vulgate and Septuagint, should not be slighted.
Pigeon — See .
Plunger — See .
Porcupine — Believed by some, on account of a certain analogy of the Hebrew qîppõd with the Arabic name of this animal, to be spoken of in the Bible. See .
Porphyrion is in Vulgate and D.V. (Leviticus 11:18), the equivalent for the Hebrew, rãhãm, translated in the Septuagint as "swan"; in the Greek version, porphyrion stands for the Hebrew, tínshéméth, interpreted as "swan" in the Latin and English Bibles. The hypothesis that the Greek translators used a Hebrew text in which the two words rãhãm and tínshéméth stood contrariwise to their present order in the Massoretic text, might account for this difference. Whatever this may be, whether the porphyrion, or purple swamphen (Porphyrio porphyrio), or the Egyptian vulture, should be identified with the rãhãm remains uncertain. See .
Pygarg (Deuteronomy ) — This word, a mere adaptation from the Greek, means "white-rumped", a character common to many species, though the antilope addax is possibly signified by the Hebrew word dîshõn.

Q

R
Rabbit (Proverbs ) — A coney. See .
Ram — See .
Raven — The Bible includes under this generic name a certain number of birds having more or less resemblance with the raven, such as the magpie, the jay, the jackdaw, the starling, etc. The raven, eight species of which are found in Israel, is by far the most common of all the birds of that country, where it is with buzzards, vultures, dogs, jackals, and hyenas, an active scavenger. Its plumage is glossy black, and its habits are frequently alluded to in Bible, for instance feeding on carcasses, wandering for its precarious meals, picking out the eyes of the newly dropped or weakly animals, resorting to desolate places, etc. The raven, when no other food is nigh, not infrequently picks out grains freshly sown; hence its surname of seed-picker, spermologos, which, later on became a synonym for ragamuffin. This name, applied to St. Paul by his sceptical listeners of Athens, has become, through a mistranslation, "word-sower" in our Bibles (Acts ).
Rhinoceros, stands for Hebrew, re'em, and should consequently be rendered by aurochs.
Ringtail — So D.V., translates rã'ah, possibly substituted by a scribe's error for dã'ah, and very likely meaning the black kite (milvus migrans).
Rooster, See . – alektór

S
Sã'îr usually signifies the he-goat. In the latter passages this sense is clearly inapplicable; it seems hardly applicable in the former. The writers of Leviticus, and 2 Paralipomenon possibly intended some representation of the same description as the goat-headed figures of the Egyptian Pantheon. Concerning the sã'îr mentioned in Isaias, no satisfactory explanation has as yet been given.
Scarlet — See .

Scorpion — Very common in all hot, dry, stony places; is taken as an emblem of the wicked.
Sea gull — Its different kinds are probably signified by the word translated larus. See .
Seal — See .
Sea monster, probably means such animals as the whale, porpoise, dugong, etc.
Serpent — A generic term whereby all ophidia are designated; ten names of different species of snakes are given in the Bible.
Shrew — So does D.V. translate the Hebr. 'anãqah, which however means rather some kind of lizard, probably the gecko.
Siren, a translation for Hebrew tán, which, indicates an animal dwelling in ruins, and may generally be rendered by jackal. No other resemblance than a verbal one should be sought between this tán and the fabulous being, famous by its allurements, called Siren by the ancient poets.
Unlike the snails of northern climates which hibernate, those of Israel sleep in summer. The Psalmist alludes "to the fact that very commonly, when they have secured themselves in some chink of the rocks for their summer sleep, they are still exposed to the sun rays, which gradually evaporate and dry up the whole of the body, till the animal is shrivelled to a thread, and, as it were, melted away" (Tristram).
Sparrow — The Hebrew word çíppôr, found over 40 times, is a general name for all small passerine birds, of which there exist about 150 species in the Holy Land.
Species — There is no recognition of classification by, or distinction according to, species in the Bible.
Spider — An arachnid living by millions in Israel, where several hundred species have been distinguished. Its web affords a most popular illustration for frail and ephemeral undertakings (Job ; Isaiah ); in three passages, however, the translators seem to have wrongly written spider for moth ( (Vulgate: Psalm 38)), sigh ( (Vulgate: Psalm 89), and pieces (Hosea ).
Stork — The Hebrew word hasîdhah, erroneously rendered "heron" by the Douay translators, Lev. 11:19, alludes to the well-known affection of the stork for its young. Several passages have reference to this bird, its periodical migrations (Jeremiah ), its nesting in fir-trees, its black pinions stretching from its white body (Zechariah ; D.V., kite; but the stork, hasîdhah, is mentioned in the Hebrew text). Two kinds, the white and the black stork, live in Israel during the winter.
Swan — Mentioned only in the list of unclean birds (Leviticus 11:18; Deuteronomy ). The swan having always been very rare in Syria, there was little need of forbidding to eat its flesh; by the Hebrew tínshéméth, some other bird might possibly be designated.
Swine — The most abhorred of all animals among the Jews; hence the swineherd's was the most degrading employment (Luke ; cf. Matthew ). Swine are very seldom kept in Israel.

T
tachash (תַּחַשׁ tāḥaš), mentioned in the Bible, its hide was used as the top-most covering of the tabernacle. 
Tiger, Job  (Hebr., לַיִשׁ láyísh), should be "lion".
Turtle — See .

U
Urchin, Soph., ii, 14. See .

V
Viper — See .
Vulture — So does D.V. render the Hebrew, אַיָּה ‘áyyah, ; ; Job, . As has been suggested above, the text of Job at least, seems to allude to the kite rather than to the vulture. Several kinds of vultures are nevertheless referred to in the Bible; so, for instance, the bearded vulture (Gypœtus barbatus), called griffon in the D.V.; the griffon vulture (Gyps fulvus), the Egyptian vulture (Neophron percnopterus), etc. In the biblical parlance vultures are often termed eagles.

W
Waterhen — See .
Weasel, must be regarded as a general name, probably designating, besides the weasel proper, the polecat and ichneumon, all very common in the Holy Land.
Whale — "And God created great whales..." ( A.V.) Hebrew Tânnîn can also be translated as "sea-monster"; porpoises and dugongs were also known to the Hebrews. In , Jesus compared his own burial to Jonah's entombment in the forestomach of a whale.
Wild dogs, 
Wolf — Frequently mentioned in the Scriptures as a special foe to flocks (Matthew 7:15), and an emblem of treachery, ferocity, and bloodthirstiness. Wolves usually prowl at night around the sheepfolds, and, though fewer in numbers than jackals, are much more harmful. The tribe of Benjamin, owing to its warlike character, was compared to a wolf. See: 
Worm — In English the translation for two Hebrew words: rímmah (Job , A.V.); and tólá' (Exodus , etc.); these two Hebrew words are general; the former designates particularly all living organisms generated and swarming in decaying or rotten substances; the latter includes not only worms, but also such insects as caterpillars, centipedes, etc.

See also
Animals in the Bible

References

 

!
Bible
Bible-related lists